John Woolley may refer to:

 John Woolley (educator) (1816–1866), professor and clergyman; first principal of the University of Sydney, Australia
 John G. Woolley (1850–1922), lawyer and public speaker; Prohibition Party's candidate for President of the United States in the election of 1900
 John W. Woolley (1831–1928), American Latter Day Saint and one of the founders of the Mormon fundamentalism movement
 John Woolley (sport shooter), New Zealand sport shooter 
 John Woolley (general) (1824–1873), American Union Civil War brevet brigadier general.
 John Woolley (footballer) (born 1935), Australian rules footballer
 Jack Woolley (footballer) (1886–1957), Austrialian rules footballer

See also
 John Wooley (born 1949), American author